The National Film Award for Best Music Direction (the Silver Lotus Award) is an honour presented annually at the National Film Awards by the Directorate of Film Festivals to a musician who has composed the best score for films produced within the Indian film industry. The award was first introduced at the 15th National Film Awards in 1967. At the 42nd National Film Awards, an award for "Best Background Score" was instituted. It was however discontinued after that, and it was not until 2009 that the category was re-introduced. A total of 51 awards—including award for Best Background score—to 40 different composers.

Although the Indian film industry produces films in around 20 languages and dialects, the recipients of the award include those who have worked in seven major languages: Hindi (19 awards), Tamil (10 awards), Malayalam (9 awards),  Telugu (8 awards), Bengali (7 awards), Kannada (5 awards) and Marathi (2 awards).

The first recipient of the award was K. V. Mahadevan who was honoured for his composition in the Tamil film Kandan Karunai (1967). A. R. Rahman is the most frequent winner having won 6 awards. Ilaiyaraaja has won it 5 times. Jaidev and Vishal Bhardwaj have won it three times each. Four musicians—B. V. Karanth, K.V. Mahadevan, Satyajit Ray and Johnson have won the award twice each. Ilaiyaraaja is the only composer to have won the award for achieving in three different languages — Telugu, Tamil and Malayalam. While A. R. Rahman won the award for performing in two different languages — Tamil and Hindi (including one for his debut film) Roja (1992).

Johnson won the inaugural "Best Background Score" award—for Sukrutham—in 1994. When the award was reinstated in 2009, Ilaiyaraaja won it for the Malayalam film Pazhassi Raja. The most recent recipients are Thaman S for Best Songs for his work in the Telugu film Ala Vaikunthapurramuloo and G. V. Prakash Kumar for Background Score for his work in the Tamil film Soorarai Pottru.

Winners

Notes

References

External links 
 Official Page for Directorate of Film Festivals, India
 National Film Awards Archives

Music
Film awards for Best Music Director
Indian music awards
India music-related lists